Vishnu Ghanashyam Deshpande was an Indian politician. He was born in Mehkar, Vidarbha, Maharashtra. V.G. Deshpande was the general secretary of the Akhil Bharatiya Hindu Mahasabha.

V.G. Deshpande took part in the civil resisters' mission of the Hindu Mahasabha to the Hyderabad state in March 1939, to protest against the Nizam's rule.

During the period of 1948 to 1952, V.G. Deshpande was repeatedly targeted by preventive arrests. On 27 January 1948 he had denounced Mohandas Gandhi, claiming Gandhi was responsible for the Partition of India. After the murder of Gandhi three days later by a Hindu Mahasabha member, Deshpande was arrested.

In the 1951 general election, V.G. Deshpande managed to get elected from two Lok Sabha constituencies (Gwalior and Guna). In Guna he obtained 56,518 votes (40.70% of the votes in the constituency), defeating the Indian National Congress candidate Gopi Krishna Vijayvargiya. In Gwailor he got 65,695 votes (45.49%), defeating the Vaidehi Charan Parashar. He renounced his Gwailor seat, to enable Hindu Mahasabha president N. B. Khare to contest it in a by-election.

V.G. Deshpande lost his parliamentary seat in the 1957 general election to Rajmata Vijayraje Scindia of the Indian National Congress. He finished second with 58,521 votes (33.04% of the votes in Guna). He later joined the Bharatiya Jana Sangh.

In early 1964, V.G. Deshpande called for on the Indian and Pakistani governments to initiate a population exchange, transporting the Hindu minority of Pakistan to India and expelling the Muslims of West Bengal and Assam to Pakistan.

V. G. Deshpande took part in the foundation of the Vishwa Hindu Parishad in 1964.

His brother, N.G. Deshpande (1909-2000), was a noted Marathi poet. His cousin, Sumati-bai Sukalikar, was also a leader of Bharatiya Jana Sangh in Nagpur, who contested a couple of elections unsuccessfully.

References

Sources

 

India MPs 1952–1957
Hindu Mahasabha politicians
Bharatiya Jana Sangh politicians
Lok Sabha members from Madhya Bharat
Vishva Hindu Parishad members
Assassination of Mahatma Gandhi
People from Guna district
People from Gwalior district
Year of birth missing
Year of death missing